Spadone may refer to:

 in Italian, a longsword
 in Latin, a eunuch